The church of Santi Bartolomeo e Martino is a Baroque-style, Roman Catholic church in Casalpusterlengo, province of Lodi, region of Lombardy, Italy.

Originally built in the 14th century, the church was rebuilt in an early Baroque style during 1602 to circa 1610. Restoration of the interiors began in 1999.

References

17th-century Roman Catholic church buildings in Italy
Churches in the province of Lodi
Roman Catholic churches completed in 1610
1610 establishments in Italy